Jai Hind College (Marathi: जय हिंद कॉलेज) is an autonomous college in Mumbai, Maharashtra, India, affiliated to the University of Mumbai. It was established in 1948.

In 2000, India Today named Jai Hind College as one of the best and most sought-after colleges in Mumbai city.

It was established just after independence, by a small group of teachers who were displaced from D. J. Science College of Karachi, Sindh, Pakistan under the supervision of Dr. Mohinder-Miles Morton.

History
Jai Hind College started as an arts and sciences college. Many new courses and subjects were introduced after its founding — the faculty of commerce was introduced in 1980, management and computer science were introduced in 1999, mass media and biotechnology in 2002, and banking and insurance in 2003.

Campus
The college is located on 'A' Road, near Churchgate Railway Station in Mumbai. The college is located across from the Arabian Sea Marine Drive promenade in South Mumbai.

Academics
Jai Hind College has both a Junior College and Regular Degree College. This means that students enroll after 10th grade for the higher secondary examination. It offers all three subject streams of Science, Commerce, and Arts for the 12th grade (Second Year Junior College/ SYJC) board examination. It is affiliated with the Maharashtra Board of Higher Education.

The college also offers bachelor's degrees in science and commerce, and Bachelor of Arts (three-year courses) and is affiliated with the University of Mumbai. It has been granted 'Autonomous' status by the University of Mumbai in 2018/19.

Jai Hind College now also offers MSc in Big Data Analytics powered by TCS.

Student life
Jai Hind College is also known for its big college fests taking place every year, namely "SHOUTT By Social & Dramatic Union," "Detour," "Talaash," "Entourage," "Kani," "Zodiak by the Rotaract Club of Jai Hind College," "Voyage," and "Cyberstrike."

Notable alumni
Aishwarya Rai Bachchan, Indian Actress
Priyanka Chopra, Indian Actress
 Kiara Advani, Indian Actress 
Kajal Aggarwal, Indian Actress
Preeti Jhangiani, Indian Actress
John Abraham, Indian Actor
Riteish Deshmukh, Indian Actor
Shaan, Indian Singer and Actor
Chanda Kochhar, Former CEO and MD of ICICI Bank
Ajay Piramal, Chairman of Piramal Group
Sagarika, Indian Singer, songwriter and Actress
 Plabita Borthakur, Indian Singer and Actress.
Vishal Dadlani, Indian Singer and Composer 
Rishi Vohra, Author
Sadhana Shivdasani, Indian Actress
Sapan Verma, Indian Standup Comedian & writer
Sunil Dutt, Indian Actor 
Minoti Vaishnav, American Songwriter
Kunal Kamra, Indian Comedian
Shweta Shetty, Indian singer
Seema Rao, Wonder Woman of India
Ravish Desai, Indian Actor
Tanmay Bhat, Indian stand-up comedian and CEO, co-founder of All India Bakchod
Madhav Chavan Co-founder of Pratham Education Foundation
Nauheed Cyrusi, British actress

See also
Churchgate College

References

External links
 Official Website

Universities and colleges in Mumbai
Educational institutions established in 1948
Affiliates of the University of Mumbai
1948 establishments in Bombay State
Colleges in India